Robert or Bob Richards may refer to:

Politicians
Robert Richards (Australian politician) (1885–1967), 32nd Premier of South Australia
Robert Richards (Welsh politician) (1884–1954), British Labour Party politician, MP for Wrexham

Sportsmen
Bobby Richards (born 1938), American football player
Bob Richards (cricketer) (born 1934), English former cricketer
Robert Richards (Australian rower) (born 1971), Australian rower
Bob Richards (Canadian rower) (1909–1989), Canadian rower
Bob Richards (1926–2023), American athlete

Others
Robert G. Richards, Chief Justice of Saskatchewan
Robert Hallowell Richards (1844–1945), American mining engineer
Robert H. Richards (politician), Delaware Attorney General from 1905–1909
Robert J. Richards (born 1942), American historian of science
Robert L. Richards, American screenwriter in 1940s and 1950s
Robert D. Richards, Canadian-born space entrepreneur
Robert Kerr Richards (1834–1924), American prominent in New York Society
Bob Richards (musician), Welsh-born drummer (Man, Asia)
Bob Richards (meteorologist) (1956–1994), American TV personality
Bob, fictional character from the Tekken series of video games whose full name is Robert Richards